Louis Robitaille (October 30, 1836 – September 4, 1888) was a Canadian politician.

Born in Varennes, Lower Canada, he was a physician before being called to the Senate of Canada for the senatorial division of Gulf, Quebec in 1883. A Conservative, he served until 1884.

References

1836 births
1888 deaths
Canadian senators from Quebec
Conservative Party of Canada (1867–1942) senators
People from Varennes, Quebec
French Quebecers